Theft is the illegal taking of another person's property without that person's freely-given consent.

Theft may also refer to:

 A Theft, a 1989 American novel by Saul Bellow
 "The Theft", a 2006 metalcore song
 Theft: A Love Story, a 2006 Australian novel by Peter Carey

See also
 Thief (disambiguation)

it:Ladro